Jamil Khadem is a former professional rugby league footballer who played in the 1990s.

References

South Sydney Rabbitohs players
Rugby league wingers